The ovarian fossa is a shallow depression on the lateral wall of the pelvis, where in the ovary lies.

This ovarian fossa has the following boundaries: 
 superiorly: by the external iliac artery and vein
 anteriorly and inferiorly: by the  broad ligament of the uterus
 posteriorly: by the ureter, internal iliac artery and vein
 inferiorly: by the obturator nerve, artery and vein

References

Mammal female reproductive system